Oserya is a genus of flowering plants belonging to the family Podostemaceae.

Its native range is northern South America, and it is found in Bolivia, Brazil (north and west-central), French Guiana, Guyana, Suriname and Venezuela.

The genus name of Oserya is in honour of Alexandre Victor Eugène Hulot d'Osery (1819–1846), a French geologist and engineer. 
It was first described and published in Ann. Sci. Nat., Bot., séries 3, Vol.11 on page 105 in 1849.

Known species
According to Kew:
Oserya biceps 
Oserya minima 
Oserya perpusilla 
Oserya pilgeri 
Oserya sphaerocarpa

References

Podostemaceae
Malpighiales genera
Plants described in 1849
Flora of northern South America
Flora of Bolivia
Flora of North Brazil
Flora of West-Central Brazil